Dean Koolhof (born 15 December 1994) is a Dutch professional footballer who plays as an attacking midfielder. He formerly played for De Graafschap, MVV Maastricht and Helmond Sport.

Personal
Dean is the son of former football player and manager Jurrie Koolhof

References

1994 births
Living people
Dutch footballers
De Graafschap players
MVV Maastricht players
Helmond Sport players
Eredivisie players
Eerste Divisie players
People from Duiven
Association football midfielders
Footballers from Gelderland